The Khajuraho–Udaipur City Express is an Express train belonging to North Western Railway zone that runs between  and  in India. It is currently being operated with 19665/19666 train numbers on a daily basis.

Service

The 19665/Khajuraho–Udaipur City Express has an average speed of 52 km/hr and covers 1090 km in 21h 10m . 19666/Udaipur City–Khajuraho Express has an average speed of 54 km/hr and covers 1090 km in 20h 10m.

Route and halts 

The halts of the train are:

 
 
 
 Kulpahar
 
 Mauranipur

Coach composition

The train has standard ICF rakes with max speed of 110 kmph. The train consists of 20 coaches:

 1 AC First-class
 1 AC II Tier
 3 AC III Tier
 9 Sleeper coaches
 4 General
 2 Generators cum Luggage/parcel van

Traction

Both trains are hauled by an Jhansi-based WAP-4 Electric locomotive from Khajuraho to Udaipur and vice versa.

Direction reversal

The train reverses its direction 2 times:

See also 

 Udaipur City railway station
 Khajuraho railway station
 Veer Bhumi Chittaurgarh Express

Notes

External links 

 19665/Khajuraho - Udaipur City Express
 19666/Udaipur City - Khajuraho Express

References 

Transport in Khajuraho
Transport in Udaipur
Express trains in India
Rail transport in Rajasthan
Rail transport in Madhya Pradesh
Rail transport in Uttar Pradesh